Kotschya is a genus of legumes in the family Fabaceae, and was recently assigned to the informal monophyletic Dalbergia clade of the Dalbergieae. It contains the following species:

 Kotschya aeschynomenoides (Baker) Dewit & P.A.Duvign.
 Kotschya africana Endl.
 Kotschya bullockii Verdc.
 Kotschya capitulifera (Baker) Dewit & P.A.Duvign.
 Kotschya carsonii (Baker) Dewit & P.A.Duvign.
 Kotschya coalescens Dewit & P.A.Duvign.
 Kotschya eurycalyx (Harms) Dewit & P.A.Duvign.
 Kotschya goetzei (Harms) Verdc.
 Kotschya imbricata Verdc.
 Kotschya longiloba Verdc.
 Kotschya lutea (Porteres) Hepper
 Kotschya micrantha (Harms) Hepper
 Kotschya ochreata (Taub.) Dewit & P.A.Duvign.
 Kotschya oubanguiensis (Tisser.) Verdc.
 Kotschya parvifolia (Burtt Davy) Verdc.
 Kotschya perrieri (R.Vig.) Verdc.
 Kotschya platyphylla (Brenan) Verdc.
 Kotschya princeana (Harms) Verdc.
 Kotschya prittwitzii (Harms) Verdc.
 Kotschya recurvifolia (Taub.) F.White
 Kotschya scaberrima (Taub.) Wild
 Kotschya schweinfurthii (Taub.) Dewit & P.A.Duvign.
 Kotschya speciosa (Hutch.) Hepper
 Kotschya stolonifera (Brenan) Dewit & P.A.Duvign.
 Kotschya strigosa (Benth.) Dewit & P.A.Duvign.
 Kotschya strobilantha (Baker) Dewit & P.A.Duvign.
 Kotschya suberifera Verdc.
 Kotschya thymodora (Baker f.) Wild
 Kotschya uguenensis (Taub.) F.White
 Kotschya uniflora (A.Chev.) Hepper

References

Dalbergieae
Fabaceae genera
Taxonomy articles created by Polbot